Luka nad Jihlavou is a market town in Jihlava District in the Vysočina Region of the Czech Republic. It has about 3,000 inhabitants.

Administrative parts
Hamlets of Otín, Předboř and Svatoslav are administrative parts of Luka nad Jihlavou.

Geography
It lies on the border bewtween the Křižanov Highlands and Upper Sázava Hills. The Jihlava River flows through the market town.

History
The first written mention of Luka nad Jihlavou is from 1378. The baroque castle was built in 1739–1747. In 1755 Maria Theresa promoted the village to a market town. Until 1768, Luka often changed hands. From 1768, it was continuously owned by the Widmann family.

Sights
The landmark of Luka nad Jihlavou is the Church of Saint Bartholomew. It was built in the late Baroque style in 1755–1763, on the site of the former Romanesque church. The tower remained original, dating back to 1200. The upper part of the tower was rebuilt in 1804, however, the lower part has been preserved to this day.

Twin towns – sister cities

Luka nad Jihlavou is twinned with:
 Forst, Germany
 Reutigen, Switzerland

References

External links

 
Virtual tour 

Market towns in the Czech Republic
Populated places in Jihlava District